This page provides the summaries of the CAF Third Round matches for the 2010 FIFA World Cup qualification. The 20 qualifiers (the 12 group winners and the best 8 runners-up from the second round) were split into five groups of four, in the draw held on 22 October 2008 in Zürich. Teams in each group will play a home-and-away round-robin in 2009, with the 5 groups winners advancing to the World Cup Finals in South Africa (together with hosts South Africa).

This round also doubles as the qualification stage for the 2010 African Cup of Nations, with the top three teams in each group qualifying for the finals (together with hosts Angola).

Seeding 
Teams were seeded based on their FIFA World Rankings in October 2008 (number in parentheses). One team from each of the following pots was drawn into each group.

Group A 

Cameroon qualified for the 2010 FIFA World Cup.
Cameroon, Gabon and Togo qualified for the 2010 Africa Cup of Nations.

Group B 

Nigeria qualified for the 2010 FIFA World Cup.
Nigeria, Tunisia, and Mozambique qualified for the 2010 African Cup of Nations.

Group C 

Algeria, Egypt and Zambia qualified for the 2010 African Cup of Nations.

Tiebreaking play-off 

Alleged crowd violence at the playoff and the preceding match led to diplomatic tension between Egypt and Algeria.

Group D 

Ghana qualified for the 2010 FIFA World Cup.
Ghana, Benin and Mali qualified for the 2010 African Cup of Nations.

Group E 

Ivory Coast qualified for the 2010 FIFA World Cup.
Ivory Coast, Burkina Faso and Malawi qualified for the 2010 African Cup of Nations.

19 people were killed in a stampede before this match.

Goalscorers 
As of 15 November, there have been 134 goals scored over 60 games at an average of 2.23 goals per game.
6 goals

 Didier Drogba

5 goals

 Moumouni Dagano

4 goals

 Matthew Amoah

3 goals

 Samuel Eto'o
 Mohamed Aboutrika
 Pascal Feindouno
 Frédéric Kanouté
 Chiukepo Msowoya
 Victor Obinna

2 goals

 Abdelkader Ghezzal
 Rafik Saïfi
 Mohamed Aoudou
 Razak Omotoyossi
 Achille Emaná
 Jean Makoun
 Hosny Abd Rabo
 Amr Zaki
 Daniel Cousin
 Roguy Méyé
 Bakari Koné
  Romaric
 Yaya Touré
 Gervinho
 Dennis Oliech
 Adel Taarabt
 Obafemi Martins
 Oussama Darragi
 Issam Jemâa

1 goal

 Nadir Belhadj
 Madjid Bougherra
 Rafik Djebbour
 Karim Matmour
 Karim Ziani
 Séïdath Tchomogo
 Romuald Boco
 Aristide Bancé
 Mahamoudou Kéré
 Habib Bamogo
 Jonathan Pitroipa
 Alain Traoré
 Pierre Webó
 Ahmed Hassan
 Emad Moteab
 Bruno Ecuele Manga
 Éric Mouloungui
 Pierre-Emerick Aubameyang
 Moise Brou
 Anthony Annan
 Kwadwo Asamoah
 Michael Essien
 Sulley Muntari
 Prince Tagoe
 Mamadou Bah
 Sambégou Bangoura
 Oumar Kalabane
 Kamil Zayatte
 Salomon Kalou
 Kader Keïta
 Siaka Tiéné
 McDonald Mariga
 Julius Owino
 Allan Wanga
 Jacob Ngwira
 Mamadou Diallo
 Lassane Fané
 Modibo Maïga
 Tenema Ndiaye
 Mamadou Samassa
 Mounir El Hamdaoui
 Domingues
 Tico-Tico
 Dário
 Michael Eneramo
 Peter Odemwingie
 Ikechukwu Uche
 Yakubu
 Patrick Mutesa Mafisango
 Mudathir El Tahir
 Hassan Korongo
 Emmanuel Adebayor
 Moustapha Salifou
 Floyd Ayité
 Ammar Jemal
 Nabil Taïder
 Wissem Ben Yahia
 Rainford Kalaba
 Francis Kasonde

Own Goal

 Mamadou Tall (for Ivory Coast)
 Saïdou Panandétiguiri (for Ivory Coast)
 Hicham Mahdoufi (for Gabon)

Notes

References 

3
Qual